Guillermo García López was the defending champion, but lost in the semifinals to Fernando Verdasco.

Verdasco went on to win the title, defeating Lucas Pouille in the final, 6–3, 6–2.

Seeds
The top four seeds receive a bye into the second round.

Draw

Finals

Top half

Bottom half

Qualifying

Seeds

Qualifiers

Qualifying draw

First qualifier

Second qualifier

Third qualifier

Fourth qualifier

References
 Main Draw
 Qualifying Draw

2016 ATP World Tour
2016 Singles